Yps is a German comic book magazine which ran for over 1,000 issues from 1975 to 2000. In 2005 and 2006 several prototype issues were published, but the series was not revived. Loosely based on the French Pif Gadget, Yps was highly popular due to the toy 'Gimmick' included with every issue.

Relaunch and closure
On October 11, 2012 Yps was relaunched as a magazine for adults, targeting readers in the 30s age group, i.e. those who were kids when the original Yps was peaking. The magazine was closed again 2017.

Tribute
On 13 October 2015, Google Doodle commemorated its 40th birthday.

References

External links
 The official German Yps homepage
 Yps Fanpage

1975 comics debuts
2000 comics endings
2012 comics debuts
Children's magazines published in Germany
Comics magazines published in Germany
German-language magazines
Magazines established in 1975
Magazines disestablished in 2000
Magazines established in 2012
Magazines disestablished in 2017
Defunct magazines published in Germany